Maurice Lindsay may refer to:

 Maurice Lindsay (broadcaster) (1918–2009), Scottish broadcaster, writer and poet
 Maurice Lindsay (rugby league) (1941–2022), rugby league administrators